Agnieszka Dulej (born 4 July 1983) is a Polish former ice dancer. She competed with Marcin Świątek and Sławomir Janicki. With Janicki, she was a two-time Polish national silver and Polish national bronze medalist.

Programs 
(with Janicki)

Competitive highlights 
With Janicki

References

External links
 

1983 births
Living people
Polish female ice dancers
Sportspeople from Łódź